Angelique Foster is a British politician who was elected Derbyshire Police and Crime Commissioner in 2021.

Political career 
Foster was a member of Derbyshire County Council for the Dronfield West and Walton ward prior to her election as PCC, elected at the 2017 Derbyshire County Council election. She was elected to the  police and crime commissioner post in May 2021, defeating Labour incumbent Hardyal Dhindsa. Foster is also a Dronfield Town Councillor.

References 

Living people
21st-century British women politicians
Police and crime commissioners in England
Conservative Party police and crime commissioners
Politicians from Derbyshire
Year of birth missing (living people)